Jason Benjamin (1971 – 16 February 2021) was an Australian painter.

Biography
Benjamin was born in Melbourne in 1971. In his youth he lived in the United States and Mexico. After brief periods of study at The Stony Brook School on Long Island and the Pratt Institute in New York City, he returned to Australia in the early 1990s. 

He began exhibiting his artwork 1989 and won the 2005 Packing Room Prize at the Archibald Prize with a painting of actor Bill Hunter titled Staring down the past. He won the 1993, 1994 and 1996 Mosman Art Prizes in Sydney. In 1997 he was awarded the Kings School Art Prize for landscape painting. He was a finalist in the Archibald Prize in 2011, 2013, 2014 and 2015.

Benjamin was found dead in the Murrumbidgee River near Carrathool, New South Wales on 16 February 2021, aged 50.

References

External links
 Royalties for art's sake
 AGNSW Press Release
 The Doug Moran National Portrait Prize 2002
  Jason Benjamin at Buratti Fine Art

1971 births
2021 deaths
Australian painters
Pratt Institute alumni
The Stony Brook School alumni
Artists from Melbourne
Archibald Prize finalists
Archibald Prize Packing Room Prize winners
Australian expatriates in the United States
Australian expatriates in Mexico